The Krause Milling Co grain elevator and flour mill site complex is composed of a 1929 grain elevator, drive shed, office/powerhouse, storage building and foundation of the 1929 flour mill, in the center of Radway, Alberta.

See also
 Esterhazy Flour Mill - 1904 wood-frame construction flour mill in Saskatchewan
 Flour Mill
 Lake of the Woods Milling Company Limited - started May 21, 1887 in Keewatin, Ontario. 
 List of museums in Alberta
 Ritchie Mill - oldest surviving flour mill in the province of Alberta.
 Scandia, Alberta
 Watson's Mill -  is a historic gristmill in Manotick, Ontario, Canada.

References

External links

Alberta Registered Historic Places - Radway's Krause Milling Company Grain Elevator and Flour Mill site complex

Open-air museums in Canada
Grain elevator museums in Alberta
Thorhild County
Flour mills in Canada
Mill museums in Canada